Ottenbreit or Ottenbrite is a surname. It is similar to Otterbein.

List of people with the surname 

 Anne Ottenbrite (born 1966), Canadian former breaststroke swimmer
 Greg Ottenbreit (born 1963), Canadian politician

References 

Surnames
Surnames of German origin
German-language surnames